This is a list of French television related events from 1959.

Events
11 March - The 4th Eurovision Song Contest is held at the Palais des Festivals et des Congrès in Cannes. Netherlands wins the contest with the song "Een beetje" performed by Teddy Scholten.

Television shows

Debuts

Discorama
Cinq colonnes à la une

1940s
Le Jour du Seigneur (1949–present)

1950s
A la découverte des Français
Le Club du jeudi (1950-1961)
Magazine féminin (1952-1970)
Lectures pour tous (1953-1968)
La Boîte à sel (1955-1960)
La Piste aux étoiles (1956-1978)
Voyage sans passeport (1957-1969)

See also
1959 in France
List of French films of 1959